Rossini! Rossini! is a 1991 Italian biographical film written and directed by Mario Monicelli. It depicts real life events of composer Gioachino Rossini. Monicelli replaced Robert Altman, who was experiencing differences with the producers. The film won the David di Donatello for Best Costumes.

Plot 
In 1868 the Italian composer Gioachino Rossini is already famous all over the country. However, his last opera The Barber of Seville is not understood and even booed by the audience at La Scala for the indecency of the sets and love situations. Also disappointed by the replicas at the Teatro San Carlo in Naples, then Rossini decides to move to Paris, where he is hailed as a genius.

Cast 
Sergio Castellitto as Young Rossini  
Philippe Noiret as  Old Rossini  
Giorgio Gaber as  Domenico Barbaja
Jacqueline Bisset as  Isabella Colbran
Assumpta Serna as  Maria Marcolini
Sabine Azéma as  Olympe Pélissier
Galeazzo Benti as  La Rochefoucauld
Feodor Chaliapin Jr. as Baron Rothschild
Claudio Gora as Dr. Bardos  
Silvia Cohen as Marietta Alboni  
Pia Velsi as Adina 
Maurizio Mattioli as Mimì  
Vittorio Gassman as  Ludwig van Beethoven (cameo)

References

External links

1991 films
Films directed by Mario Monicelli
Films about classical music and musicians
Films about composers
Films set in the 1810s
Films set in 1868
Italian biographical films
Gioachino Rossini
Films with screenplays by Suso Cecchi d'Amico
1990s Italian-language films
1990s Italian films
Cultural depictions of Italian men